The events of 2005 in anime.

Events
Home video sales of anime DVDs and Laserdiscs in Japan in this year were worth 97.1 billion yen.
May 9 - A-1 Pictures is created

Accolades
At the Mainichi Film Awards, Fullmetal Alchemist the Movie: Conqueror of Shamballa won the Animation Film Award and tough guy! won the Ōfuji Noburō Award. Internationally, Howl's Moving Castle was nominated for the Academy Award for Best Animated Feature. It won the New York Film Critics Circle Award for Best Animated Film and was also nominated for the Annie Award for Best Animated Feature, the fifth consecutive year an anime was nominated for the award. Hayao Miyazaki received the Golden Lion for Lifetime Achievement at the 62nd Venice International Film Festival.

Releases

Films 
A list of anime films that debuted in theaters between 1 January and 31 December 2005.

Television series
A list of anime television series that debuted between January 1 and December 31, 2005.

OVAs & Specials 
A list of original video animations (OVAs), original net animations (ONAs), original animation DVDs (OADs), and specials released between 1 January and 31 December 2005. Titles listed are named after their series if their associated OVA, special, etc. was not named separately.

See also
2005 in animation

References

External links 
Japanese animated works of the year, listed in the IMDb

Years in anime
2005 in animation
2005 in Japan